Max and Helen is a 1990 American drama film directed by Philip Saville and written by Corey Blechman. It is based on the 1982 book Max and Helen by Simon Wiesenthal. The film stars Treat Williams, Alice Krige, Martin Landau, Jonny Phillips, Adam Kotz and Jodhi May. The film premiered on TNT on 8 January 1990.

Plot
Based on the fact-based novel by Nazi-hunter Simon Wiesenthal based on his 1962 prosecution of the head of a German factory whom he learns was a murderous labor camp commandant. To be able to take him to justice, he must find witnesses who can help him. This leads him to Max Rosenberg, a still tormented individual who lost his wife, Helen, in the camps. Initially Max refuses to cooperate, but gradually his story unfolds beginning before the Holocaust. Venice, 1944, Max, a Jewish student, is captured by the Nazis. Hélène, his French fiancée, pretends she is Jewish as well, so they both get deported to Poland. They get married on the train from where they escape, only to be captured again and separated. Max survives a firing squad and flees to Poland where he joins the resistance. Hélène will stay behind in the concentration camp to become the victim of the sadistic German officer, Koeller. In 1960, after surviving the War and the Soviet Gulag, Max finds out that Koeller killed Hélene and starts chasing him to get his revenge. During his manhunt, he meets Simon Wiesenthal, the famous Nazi hunter, who is also trying to catch Koeller.

Cast 
Treat Williams as Max Rosenberg
Alice Krige as Helen Weiss
Martin Landau as Simon Wiesenthal
Jonny Phillips as Werner Schultze / Mark Weiss 
Adam Kotz as Peter
Jodhi May as Miriam Weiss
Nicholas Woodeson as Martin Greenbaum
Lulee Fisher as Judith
Ian Bartholomew as Magistrate
Zoltán Gera as Elderly Man
John Grillo as Joseph Weiss
Aviva Goldkorn as Mrs. Weiss
Béla Jáki as SS Officer / Camp
Richard Kane as Businessman
István Kanitzsai as SS Officer Train
Péter Kertész as Otto
János Kulka as Berek
Ági Margitai as Wanda
Mátyás Margittai as Balke
Ferenc Némethy as Ackerman
Gábor Salinger as Gershan
Ottó Ulmann as Rubin

References

External links
 

1990 television films
1990 films
1990 drama films
TNT Network original films
Films directed by Philip Saville
American drama television films
1990s English-language films
American World War II films
World War II films based on actual events
1990s American films